Vivian Yang (born 11 January 2005) is a New Zealand tennis player. She has won one singles and two doubles titles on the ITF Circuit.

Early life
Yang was born in Auckland, New Zealand before moving to China with her family. She began playing tennis at 4 years of age with her father encouraging her to take up sport to help her immune system. As he was a keen amateur tennis player himself Vivian played at the nearby courts too. After returning to New Zealand Yang attended Westlake Girls High School, Auckland and joined the Tennis NZ’s high performance programme.

Career
Yang made her senior debut for New Zealand in the 2022 Billie Jean King Cup playing in Pool
A Asia/Oceania Zone Group I matches against China, South Korea and Indonesia in April, 2022. New Zealand captain Marina Erakovic championed her inclusion saying “Vivian is one of our best young players coming through. She has improved massively over the past two years and is gaining experience by the day with her recent playing schedule. Even though she is young, she is a huge asset to the team.” After her debut defeat against Chinese No 2 Yue Yang, ranked at 143 in the world, which included 4 squandered set points in the first set Erakovic remained positive saying “I was very impressed with Vivian. She played extremely well, and was able to actually really dictate on her own terms with that lefty serve and forehand and she had a couple of set points but just got a little bit tight, that inexperience but yeah, just really positives out there for her.” Vivian Yang secured her first senior win a few days later against Indonesia’s Beatrice Gumulya with a 7-5, 6-2 victory on 16 April 2022. By the end of 2022 Yang was New Zealand’s No 1 under-18 singles and doubles player.

ITF Circuit finals

Singles: 2 (1 titles, 1 runner-ups)

Doubles: 2 (2 titles)

References

External links
 
 

Living people
New Zealand female tennis players
Sportspeople from Auckland
New Zealand people of Chinese descent
Tennis players from Auckland
People from Auckland
2005 births